2-Oxopent-4-enoic acid (2-oxopent-4-enoate) is formed by the dehydration of 4-hydroxy-2-oxopentanoate by 2-oxopent-4-enoate hydratase or by the hydrolysis of 2-hydroxymuconate semialdehyde by 2-hydroxymuconate-semialdehyde hydrolase.

References

External links
 Oxopentenoate, biocyc.org

Alpha-keto acids